"Americanos" is a song by English singer Holly Johnson, released in 1989 as the second single from his debut solo album, Blast (1989). It was written by Johnson, and produced by Andy Richards and Steve Lovell, with additional production from Dan Hartman.

The song reached  4 in the United Kingdom and was a commercial success across Europe, topping the Austrian Singles Chart and peaking at No. 3 on the Eurochart Hot 100. A music video was filmed to promote the single. This featured an affluent American family and their somewhat poorer but good hearted neighbours each watching a televised lottery show.

Critical reception
Upon release, Chris Heath of Smash Hits described the song as an 80s update of David Bowie's Young Americans in both its content and its spirit, where he acknowledges the superficiality of the American dream but isn't narrow-minded enough to simply condemn it." New Musical Express noted the song's "acid irony". Steve Sutherland of Melody Maker described the song as having "skirt-twirling Latinate sarcasm". Music & Media described the song as a "thoroughly modern slice of blue-eyed soul" and "very commercial".

Track listings

 7-inch single
 "Americanos" – 3:34
 "Americanos" (Mambo Dub Mix) – 4:11

 12-inch single
 "Americanos" (Liberty Mix) – 5:32
 "Americanos" (radio 7-inch mix) – 3:34
 "Americanos" (Mambo Dub Mix) – 4:11

 12-inch remix single ("Magimix" release)
 "Americanos" (Magimix) – 6:38
 "Americanos" (Magimix Dub) – 4:09

 12-inch remix single (American/Canadian extended version release)
 "Americanos" (extended version) – 6:44
 "Americanos" (P.W.L. extended version) – 5:10

 12-inch remix single ("Like an Americanos" release)
 "Americanos" (House Piano Remix) – 6:44
 "Americanos" (bonus piano and effects) – 5:10

 CD single
 "Americanos (radio 7-inch mix) – 3:37
 "Americanos (Liberty Mix) – 5:32
 "Americanos (Mambo Dub Mix) – 4:14

Charts

Weekly charts

Year-end charts

Certifications

References

1989 singles
1989 songs
Holly Johnson songs
MCA Records singles
Songs about the United States
Songs written by Holly Johnson